Claim may refer to:

 Claim (legal)
 Claim of Right Act 1689
 Claims-based identity
 Claim (philosophy)
 Land claim
 A main contention, see conclusion of law
 Patent claim
 The assertion of a proposition; see Douglas N. Walton
 A right
 Sequent, in mathematics
 Another term for an advertising slogan
Health claim
 A term in contract bridge
 king of claim (Indonesia)

Entertainment
 The Claim, a 2000 British-Canadian Western romance film
 The Claim (band), a British band

See also
 "Claimed", an episode of the television series The Walking Dead
 Reclaim (disambiguation)